Phlegra cinereofasciata is a species of jumping spiders that can be found in Siberia and China. It was described by Kulczyński in 1891.

Description
The spider has four eyes, and is brownish-gray coloured.

References

Salticidae
Spiders of Russia
Fauna of Siberia
Spiders described in 1891
Taxa named by Władysław Kulczyński